An electride is an ionic compound in which an electron is the anion. Solutions of alkali metals in ammonia are electride salts. In the case of sodium, these blue solutions consist of [Na(NH3)6]+ and solvated electrons: 
Na  +  6 NH3  →   [Na(NH3)6]+ + e−
The cation [Na(NH3)6]+ is an octahedral coordination complex.

Solid salts
Addition of a complexant like crown ether or [2.2.2]-cryptand to a solution of [Na(NH3)6]+e− affords [Na (crown ether)]+e− or [Na(2,2,2-crypt)]+e−. Evaporation of these solutions yields a blue-black paramagnetic solid with the formula [Na(2,2,2-crypt)]+e−.

Most solid electride salts decompose above 240 K, although [Ca24Al28O64]4+(e−)4 is stable at room temperature. In these salts, the electron is delocalized between the cations. Electrides are paramagnetic, and are Mott insulators. Properties of these salts have been analyzed.

ThI2 and ThI3 have also been reported to be electride compounds.

Reactions
Solutions of electride salts are powerful reducing agents, as demonstrated by their use in the Birch reduction. Evaporation of these blue solutions affords a mirror of Na metal. If not evaporated, such solutions slowly lose their colour as the electrons reduce ammonia:
2[Na(NH3)6]+e− → 2NaNH2 + 10NH3 + H2
This conversion is catalyzed by various metals. An electride, [Na(NH3)6]+e−, is formed as a reaction intermediate.

High-pressure elements
Theoretical evidence supports electride behaviour in insulating high-pressure forms of potassium, sodium, and lithium. Here the isolated electron is stabilized by efficient packing, which reduces enthalpy under external pressure. The electride is identified by a maximum in the electron localization function, which distinguishes the electride from pressure-induced metallization. Electride phases are typically semiconducting or have very low conductivity, usually with a complex optical response. A sodium compound called disodium helide has been created under  of pressure.

Layered electrides (Electrenes)
Layered electrides or electrenes are single-layer materials consisting of alternating atomically thin two-dimensional layers of electrons and ionized atoms. The first example was Ca2N, in which the charge (+4) of two calcium ions is balanced by the charge of a nitride ion (-3) in the ion layer plus a charge (-1) in the electron layer.

See also
F-center

References

Further reading
 
JCTC

Salts
Electron